Ribeira Peixe (formerly: Perseverança) is a seaside village on São Tomé Island in the nation of São Tomé and Príncipe. Its population is 503 (2012 census). It lies 1 km southwest of Praia Pesqueira and 6 km southwest of São João dos Angolares. There was a plantation complex (roça) at Ribeira Peixe, that produced cocoa, copra, coconut and palm oil.

Population history

References

Populated places in Caué District
Populated coastal places in São Tomé and Príncipe